The Florida Jewish News was an independent weekly newspaper serving the South Florida Jewish community from 2005 through 2007.

South Florida, which comprises Miami-Dade County, Palm Beach County and Broward County, has the second-largest Jewish population in North America, now tallied at 603,000, according to studies performed by demographer Ira Sheskin of the University of Miami.

Publisher Avi Frier founded the paper in May 2005 as a free biweekly publication; the paper began publishing weekly in October 2005 and closed in October 2007.

The Florida Jewish News was a member of the American Jewish Press Association (AJPA).  Publisher Avi Frier was a member of the Society of Professional Journalists (SPJ).

After closing the newspaper, publisher Avi Frier went back to his previous career as a corporate entertainer and comedy magician.

External links
Web site of Avi Frier, former publisher of the Florida Jewish News, now a full-time entertainer
American Jewish Press Association (AJPA) web site
Florida Jewish News profile on the AJPA web site
South Florida Jewish directory

Defunct newspapers published in Florida
Jewish newspapers published in the United States
Jews and Judaism in Florida
Weekly newspapers published in the United States
Publications established in 2005
2005 establishments in Florida
Publications disestablished in 2007
2007 disestablishments in Florida